Xavier School (also referred to by its acronym XS) is a private, Catholic, college preparatory school run by the Philippine Province of the Society of Jesus. Its main campus is at 64 Xavier Street, Greenhills, San Juan, Metro Manila, Philippines. It has a southern satellite campus along West Conservation Avenue in Nuvali, Canlubang, Calamba, Laguna mainly aimed to serve financially challenged students. It is a K-12 school with a curriculum that includes a mandatory Chinese language program. It also offers an optional International Baccalaureate program in grades 11 and 12 to interested students.

A Catholic institution with an English curriculum and Chinese studies, Xavier School continues educating Chinese-Filipinos as part of its original mission to evangelise them and promote their integration into Philippine society. Through its Grant-in-Aid program, the school also offers financially challenged but otherwise qualified students an opportunity of attaining a Xavier education.
			
Unlike other Chinese schools in the Philippines, Xavier School was founded as an all-boys institution. Its San Juan campus continues to admit only male students. Its newer Nuvali campus is coeducational.

History
Many Jesuit missionaries who were expelled from China in 1949 found a new home and mission in the overseas Chinese communities in the Philippines. To facilitate their evangelization of the Chinese communities, the Jesuits decided to set up schools. One of those schools was in downtown Manila. Begging for donations by going door-to-door in Chinatown, Fr. Jean Desautels, S.J., a French-Canadian Jesuit who was part of the China mission, received financial aid from Basilio King and Ambrose Chiu, two Chinese-Filipino businessmen who wanted to help set up a Jesuit school for the Chinese.

After soliciting the fund sufficient to buy a piece of land for the school campus, the Jesuits proceeded to negotiate with land owners in downtown Manila. At 3:30 pm on December 15, 1955, Fr. Desautels closed a deal and purchased a land, an hour and a half before the 5:00 pm deadline set by its seller. The group of Jesuits led by the late Frs. Jean Desautels, Louis Papilla, and Cornelius Pineau went on to found a School and named it Kuang Chi School after Paul Hsü Kuangchi, a 16th-century Chinese nobleman and Minister of Rites during the Ming Dynasty who converted to Christianity and supported its spread in China. On June 6, 1956, in a converted warehouse in Echague, Manila, the school opened its doors to its initial batch of students – 170 children of Chinese immigrants in the Philippines. The school was renamed later on as Xavier School after St. Francis Xavier, co-founder of the Society of Jesus and one of the first leaders of Jesuit missions in China

The school celebrated its Golden Jubilee in 2006. Hoofy, the school's mascot, was in attendance during the celebration.

School of Excellence
Being a Jesuit school helped establish the school's reputation. In 1960, Xavier School transferred to a 7-hectare property in Greenhills, San Juan, then only an area of rice fields and grasslands. Within a decade, the outlying areas became home to many Xavier families. The campus is a complex of 12 buildings housing over 4,000 students from nursery to high school.

It is one of the few basic education institutions in the Philippines to receive a 7-year accreditation, the longest possible period, and one of only three institutions, along with De La Salle University and Ateneo de Manila University, to receive the Level III accreditation for both the grade school and high school by the Philippine Accrediting Association of Schools, Colleges, and Universities. In January 2010, Xavier School was granted International Baccalaureate (IB) World School status. In 2013, Fr. Aristotle Dy, SJ assumed the position of school president after the end of the term of pioneer Fr. Johnny Go, SJ.

Admissions
Admission to Xavier School is extremely competitive. Generally, students enter Xavier as kindergarten students. "Boys" may also try to be part of the student population as high school freshmen (Grade 9), by taking the Xavier High School Entrance Examination. Transfer students are occasionally accepted but the requirements are incredibly high.

Athletics
Xavier School fields over thirty teams in twelve sports including basketball, football, badminton, volleyball, swimming, among others.

Mascot
The official caricature of the school Mascot, Hoofy, was created in the school year 2002 to 2003. It was designed by David Gonzales of the class of 2005. A life-size model of Hoofy goes around campus, is available for performance at special events.

Awards
 Xavier's Dance X is the champion of the 2006 Skechers Street Dancing competition (High School division).
 The Xavier Football club won 3rd place in the 2006 Alaska Football Cup.
 The Xavier School team, composed of David Hwang, Zachary Sy, and Philbert Tan, all of Batch 2019, bested hundreds of students across Southeast Asia in the 2017 University of Technology Sydney (UTS) International Technology Innovation Competition. Representing the Philippines, they won the Judges’ Choice Award for Streetflow, a smart streetlight system.
 The Xavier Debate Team, the school's official debate club, has won the Philippine Schools Debate Championship (PSDC) for four years: 2007, 2012, 2016, and 2017.

Incidents
Sometime past noon on November 12, 2014, a Grade 11 student from Xavier High School was seen sitting on the ledge on the fifth floor of the school building. The school authorities immediately called the San Juan City Rescue Team, the Philippine National Police (PNP), and the Bureau of Fire Protection (BFP) for help. After about an hour of speaking to the authorities, the boy agreed to get back inside the building. Based on the police investigation, the boy wanted to jump off the building due to family problems. 

The incident was recorded by ANC as authorities are seen attempting to convince the boy to not jump. The video and the news article published by ANC news has since been since deleted as of December 20, 2021. Many speculate this to be forced censorship by Xavier School authorities to protect the reputation and name of the school.

Notable students
 Drew Arellano (1997) – TV show host
 J. V. Ejercito (1987) – politician
 Rexlon T. Gatchalian (1997) – politician
 Isaac Go (2014) –  basketball player
 Michael Tan (1983) – Chief Operating Officer, Asia Brewery
 Jeric Teng (2009) – basketball player
 Jeron Teng (2012) – basketball player
 Gilberto "Gibo" Teodoro Jr. (1981) – politician
 Christopher John Tiu (2003) –  basketball player and entrepreneur 
 Arthur C. Yap (1983) – politician
 Joseph Henry Yeo (2001) – basketball player
 Carlo Katigbak (1987) - President and CEO, ABS-CBN
 Karl Kendrick T. Chua (1996) - Former Secretary, National Economic and Development Authority (NEDA)

Further reading
 Mena SJ, Santos. Luceat Lux: The Story of Xavier School. 2005.
 Dy SJ, Aristotle (ed.). Our Pride and Glory, Xavier School at Fifty. 2006.
 Palanca, Ellen / Clinton (ed.). Chinese Filipinos. 2003.
 Gomez, Peter Martin (ed.). The Xavier School Institutional Identity Book. 2005.
 Dy SJ, Aristotle. Weaving a Dream: Reflections for Chinese-Filipino Catholics Today. 2000.

See also
 List of Jesuit schools

References

External links
 Official website

Chinese-language schools in Metro Manila
Boys' schools in the Philippines
Catholic elementary schools in Metro Manila
Catholic secondary schools in Metro Manila
International Baccalaureate schools in the Philippines
Schools in Calamba, Laguna
Schools in San Juan, Metro Manila
Jesuit schools in the Philippines